
McCrory may refer to:

People
McCrory (surname)

Places
 McCrory, Arkansas, United States
 McCrory Gardens and South Dakota Arboretum

Businesses
 McCrory Stores

See also
 McCrorey (disambiguation)